Michael Wilson Purdon is a former Scottish international lawn bowler.

Bowls career
He won two silver medals in the pairs with Thomas Hamill and fours at the 1962 British Empire and Commonwealth Games in Perth with Thomas Hamill, Joseph Black and William Moore.

He also won the 1960 pairs title with Hamill at the Scottish National Bowls Championships.

References

Date of birth unknown
Scottish male bowls players
Commonwealth Games silver medallists for Scotland
Bowls players at the 1962 British Empire and Commonwealth Games
Commonwealth Games medallists in lawn bowls
Medallists at the 1962 British Empire and Commonwealth Games